Henryk Machalica (18 June 1930 in Chybie – 1 November 2003 in Warsaw) was a Polish film and stage actor.

Selected filmography
 Woman in a Hat (1985)
 Boris Godunov (1986)

References 
 Profile at FilmPolski.pl portal

1930 births
2003 deaths
People from Cieszyn County
Polish male film actors
Polish male stage actors
Polish male television actors
Polish male voice actors
Burials at Powązki Cemetery
Recipient of the Meritorious Activist of Culture badge